Fenerbahçe Ülker is the professional men's basketball department of Fenerbahçe S.K., a major multisport club based in Istanbul, Turkey.

For the season roster: 2012–13 roster

Group A regular season

Fixtures/results
All times given below are in Central European Time.

Group F Top 16

External links
Official Fenerbahçe site 
Euro League Page 
TBLStat.net 
Euroleague Format
Euroleague.net
Fenerbahçe fansite

References

2012-13
2012–13 Euroleague by club
2012–13 in Turkish basketball by club